Emilia Mendieta  (born 4 February 1988) is an Argentine futsal player and a former footballer who played as a forward.

She was part of the Argentina women's national football team  at the 2008 Summer Olympics. On club level she played for River Plate.

See also
 Argentina at the 2008 Summer Olympics

References

External links
 
 Scoresway
 Soccerpunter
 FIFA
 Getty Images
 decaturdaily

1988 births
Living people
Place of birth missing (living people)
Argentine women's futsal players
Argentine women's footballers
Women's association football forwards
Club Atlético River Plate (women) players
Argentina women's international footballers
2007 FIFA Women's World Cup players
Footballers at the 2008 Summer Olympics
Olympic footballers of Argentina
Argentine expatriate sportspeople in Italy